A referendum on changes to the electoral law was held in Cambodia on 26 January 1958. The changes would reduce the number of MPs from 91 to 61. It was approved by 99.9% of voters. Fresh elections under the new law took place in March.

Results

References

Referendums in Cambodia
1958 in Cambodia
1958 referendums
Electoral reform referendums
Electoral reform in Cambodia